The 10th British Independent Film Awards, held in November 2007 at the Roundhouse in Camden, London, honoured the best British independent films of 2007.

Awards

Best British Independent Film
 Control
 And When Did You Last See Your Father?
 Eastern Promises
 Hallam Foe
 Notes on a Scandal

Best Director
 Anton Corbijn – Control
 Anand Tucker – And When Did You Last See Your Father?
 Sarah Gavron – Brick Lane
 David Cronenberg – Eastern Promises
 David Mackenzie – Hallam Foe

The Douglas Hickox Award
Given to a director of a British film on their debut feature
 Anton Corbijn – Control
  Marc Francis and Nick Francis – Black Gold
 Oliver Hodge – Garbage Warrior
 David Schwimmer – Run Fatboy Run
 Steve Hudson – True North

Best Actor
 Viggo Mortensen – Eastern Promises
 Jim Broadbent – And When Did You Last See Your Father?
 Sam Riley – Control
 Jamie Bell – Hallam Foe
 Cillian Murphy – Sunshine

Best Actress
 Judi Dench – Notes on a Scandal
 Anne Hathaway – Becoming Jane
 Tannishtha Chatterjee – Brick Lane
 Sophia Myles – Hallam Foe
 Kierston Wareing – It's a Free World...

Best Supporting Actor/Actress
 Toby Kebbell – Control
 Colin Firth – And When Did You Last See Your Father?
 Samantha Morton – Control
 Armin Mueller-Stahl – Eastern Promises
 Cate Blanchett – Notes on a Scandal

Best Screenplay
 Patrick Marber – Notes on a Scandal
 David Nicholls – And When Did You Last See Your Father?
 Matt Greenhalgh - Control
 Steven Knight – Eastern Promises
 Ed Whitmore and David Mackenzie – Hallam Foe

Most Promising Newcomer
 Sam Riley - Control
 Imogen Poots - 28 Weeks Later
 Matthew Beard - And When Did You Last See Your Father?
 Bradley Cole - Exhibit A
 Kierston Wareing – It's a Free World...

Best Achievement in Production
 Black Gold
 Control
 Exhibit A
 Extraordinary Rendition
 Garbage Warrior

Best Technical Achievement
 Mark Tildesley - Sunshine (for production design)
 Enrique Chediak - 28 Weeks Later (for cinematography)
 Trevor Waite - And When Did You Last See Your Father? (for editing)
 Martin Ruhe - Control (for cinematography)
 Colin Monie and David Mackenzie – Hallam Foe (for music)

Best British Documentary
 Joe Strummer: The Future Is Unwritten
 Black Gold
 Deep Water
 Garbage Warrior
 In the Shadow of the Moon

Best British Short
 Dog Altogether
 À bout de truffe
 Cherries
 The Girls
 What Does Your Daddy Do?

Best Foreign Film
 The Lives of Others - (Germany) La vie en rose - (France)
 Tell No One - (France)
 Once - (Ireland)
 Black Book - (Netherlands)

The Raindance Award
 The Inheritance
 Exhibit A
 Tovarisch, I Am Not Dead

The Richard Harris Award
 Ray Winstone

Special Jury Prize
 Robert Beeson, Andi Engel, Pamela Engel - Artificial Eye

Entertainment Personality Award
 Daniel Craig

External links
 BIFE Homepage

References

British Independent Film Awards
2007 film awards
Independent Film Awards
2007 in London
November 2007 events in the United Kingdom